Gigantiform cementoma is a rare, autosomal dental tumor.  It is benign, but without intervention it can result in severe disfigurement of the jaw.  The cause of this tumor is currently unknown. This is an exceedingly rare tumor with only a handful of documented cases worldwide. The most famous case is of Novemthree Siahaan (who died on September 15, 2005), a young Indonesian boy from Batam Island who received medical care in Haulien, Taiwan through a Buddhist missionary from the Tzu Chi Foundation, which was documented on the Discovery Health Channel. Another famous case is a young Korean girl named Ayun Lee (August 26, 2003~) and her father Young-hak Lee whose case has shown that the tumor can be heritable. She is currently under treatment, which she may need to continue until her growth stops in her early 20s. 

The term has been used in the past to describe florid cemento-osseous dysplasia, but it is now reserved for an autosomal dominant condition affecting the maxillae. It affects mostly Caucasian people under the age of 10. Treatment is difficult. Surgical removal of the affected bone is needed, and has to be followed by reconstruction.

References

External links 

Rare cancers